Andres Kork (born on 15 April 1950 in Tallinn) is an Estonian surgeon and politician. He was a member of X Riigikogu.

In 1992, he was the Estonian Health Minister. He has been a member of the party Res Publica.

References

Living people
1950 births
Estonian surgeons
Government ministers of Estonia
Res Publica Party politicians
Members of the Riigikogu, 2003–2007
University of Tartu alumni
People from Tallinn
Politicians from Tallinn